Marinus Jan "Martin" van Beek (1 April 1960 – 26 August 2018) was a Dutch politician representing the Party for Freedom in the Senate.

Between 2006 and 2009, van Beek studied New Business Development at the Business School Nederland, earning an MBA.

He was a member of the Dutch Senate between 2 October 2012 and 9 June 2015 and again from 28 March 2017 until 25 October 2017, when he was temporarily replaced by Max Aardema due to illness. He returned on 14 February 2018 and left once again on 14 March 2018 to be replaced by Aardema once more. Van Beek returned to the Senate on 4 July 2018.

Van Beek died at the age of 58 in Leersum on 26 August 2018 due to an accident.

References

1960 births
2018 deaths
Dutch management consultants
Members of the Senate (Netherlands)
Party for Freedom politicians
People from Ridderkerk
21st-century Dutch politicians